Timo Rautiainen ja Trio Niskalaukaus (fin. "Timo Rautiainen and Trio Neckshot") is a heavy metal band from Finland, formed in 1997. The band was led by Timo Rautiainen, leading member of Finnish metallers Lyijykomppania, a band which is still highly popular in Finland and has a small foreign following in the scene. The musical influence of the band ranges from Black Sabbath to more modern metal acts. Lyrically, the themes presented in their songs range from global issues (such as global warming, genocide, war and nuclear waste or nuclear weapons left loose) to personal tragedy (such as the death of a loved one, school bullying and suicide), typically in a dark and serious tone. They have released seven albums to date.

For more than 20 years, Rautiainen has made music in the Finnish language. However, when a friend came to him with the idea of making a German spoken album, Rautiainen was very interested. The album produced during this session, In frostigen Tälern ("In Frozen Valleys") (2001), was the first German album by a Finnish act. In 2004 the band released their second album in German, titled Hartes Land ("Hard Land"). The albums in German consist of songs which had already been released in Finnish and later translated.

A visional cue in the band's album art is that no upper case letters are used in any occasion. Their logo is a shovel crossed with a pickaxe, usually both covered with breeze. Also in live shows, the logo is used as backdrop with a skull accompanying the shovel and pickaxe.

The band has published several music videos, some of them dedicated to (and filmed with) Finnish military serving under KFOR mission in Kosovo.

A biographical book about Rautiainen and his bands was released in 2003. It was written by Finnish journalist Timo Isoaho.

The band announced that it would be going on break for an indefinite period of time as of December 2004. On November 1, 2006, the band announced that they would be breaking up. Timo Rautiainen went on to pursue a solo career by himself and was eventually joined by the former guitarist Jarkko Petosalmi. He made 3 albums (Sarvivuori, Loppuun ajettu, En oo keittäny enkä myyny) before creating yet another project named Timo Rautiainen ja Neljäs sektori. This band had essentially the same line-up as they did in Timo's solo career except a new drummer was hired. After Jarkko urged Timo to reunite with Trio Niskalaukaus several times Timo decided to play a single concert with the Trio Niskalaukaus line-up using the cover name "Liiton Miehet" in 2016. With the band being less burnt out from excess touring Timo decided to give Trio Niskalaukaus a new shot.

In 2017 the band indeed did a comeback, releasing a new album ("Lauluja Suomesta", "Songs from Finland" in English) and going on tour. A new biography named "Trio Niskalaukaus" featuring interviews from the band members was released on August 17, 2018, as a follow up to the first book of the same name and author.

Members

Last known line-up
 Timo Rautiainen - vocals, guitar (1997–2006, 2017-)
 Jarkko Petosalmi - guitar (1998–2006, 2017-)
 Jari Huttunen - guitar (2002–2006, 2017-)
 Nils Ursin - bass (1999–2006, 2017-)
 Seppo Pohjolainen - backing vocals, drums (1997–2006, 2017-)

Former members 
 Karri Rämö - guitar (1997–2001)
 Arto Alaluusua - bass (1997–1999)
 Teppo Haapasalo - guitar (1997–1998)
 Valtteri Revonkorpi - keyboards (1997)

Discography

Albums 
 Lopunajan merkit (Signs of End Times) - 1999
 Itku pitkästä ilosta (Weep will follow from a long delight) - 2000
 In frostigen Tälern (In Frozen Valleys) - 2001
 Rajaportti (Bordergate) - 2002
 Rajaportti-platinapainos - 2002 (special edition of Rajaportti including Tiernapojat EP)
 Kylmä tila (Cold Farm) - 2004
 Hartes Land (Hard Land) - 2004
 Lauluja Suomesta (Songs from Finland) - 2017
 Mahdoton yhtälö (Impossible Equation) - 2020

Singles 
 Rajaton rakkaus (Borderless Love) - 2000
 Surupuku (Mourning Attire) - 2002
 Elegia (Elegy) - 2002
 Lumessakahlaajat (Waders in the Snow) - 2002
 Hyvä ihminen (Good Man) - 2004
 Minun oikeus (My Right) - 2004

EPs 
 Hävetkää! (Shame on You!) - 1997
 Kuilun partaalla (On the Edge of a Shaft) - 2001
 Tiernapojat - 2002

Compilations 
 Tilinteon Hetki (Moment of Truth) - 2004

DVDs 
 DVD - 2003
 Perunkirjoitus (Estate Inventory) - 2009

Music videos
 "Hyvä päivä" (A Good Day) - 2000
 "Rajaton rakkaus" (Borderless Love) - 2000
 "Nyt on mies!" (Now heres a Man!) - 2001
 "Lumessakahlaajat" (Waders in the Snow) - 2002
 "Kylmä tila" (Cold Farm) - 2004
"Pitkän kaavan mukaan" - 2017
"Suomi sata vuotta" (Finland One-Hundred Years) - 2017

References

Sources
 Timo Isoaho, Matti Riekki: Trio Niskalaukaus (2003 Ranka-kustannus Oy - )

External links
 Official homepage
 Timo Rautiainen's official homepage

Finnish heavy metal musical groups
Musical groups established in 1997
Musical groups disestablished in 2006